This list of publications by John Dewey complements the partial list contained in the John Dewey article.

Dewey (1859–1952) was an American philosopher, psychologist, and educational reformer, whose thoughts and ideas have been greatly influential in the United States and around the world. He was a prolific writer and, over a career spanning some 65 years, his output was extraordinary, covering a wide range of topics.

The full collection of his writings, making up 37 volumes, has been edited by JoAnn Boydston for the Southern Illinois University Press (Carbondale, Illinois), as follows:

 The Early Works, 1882–1898 (5 volumes)
 The Middle Works, 1899–1924 (15 volumes)
 The Later Works (17 volumes)

Books 
Psychology (1887) 
Leibniz's New Essays Concerning the Human Understanding (1888) 
The School and Society (1900) 
The Child and the Curriculum (1902) 
Studies in Logical Theory (1903) 
Moral Principles in Education (1909) 
How We Think (1910) 
The Influence of Darwin on Philosophy: And Other Essays in Contemporary Thought (1910) 
 Schools of To-Morrow (with Evelyn Dewey) (1915) 
Democracy and Education: An Introduction to the Philosophy of Education (1916) 
Essays in Experimental Logic (1916) 
Reconstruction in Philosophy (1919) 
Human Nature and Conduct: An Introduction to Social Psychology (1922) 
Experience and Nature (1925) 
The Public and its Problems (1927)
Impressions of Soviet Russia (1928/1929) 
The Quest for Certainty (1929) 
Individualism Old and New (1930)
Philosophy and Civilization (1931)
Ethics, second edition (with James Hayden Tufts) (1932)
How We Think, second edition (1933)
Art as Experience (1934)
A Common Faith (1934)
Liberalism and Social Action (1935)
Experience and Education (1938)
Logic: The Theory of Inquiry (1938) 
Theory of Valuation (1939) (Vol. 2.4 of the International Encyclopedia of Unified Science)
Freedom and Culture (1939)
Knowing and the Known (with Arthur Bentley) (1949)

Articles 
"The New Psychology" Andover Review, 2, 278–289 (1884) 
"The Ego as Cause" The Philosophical Review, 3, 337–341 (1894) 
 "The Reflex Arc Concept in Psychology" (1896) 
"My Pedagogic Creed" (1897)
"The Postulate of Immediate Empiricism" (1905)

Bibliographies by writer
 
Bibliographies of American writers
Philosophy bibliographies
John Dewey